Ülle Madise (née Anton; born 11 December 1974) is an Estonian lawyer who has served as Chancellor of Justice since 2015. Madise is the daughter of former member of the Supreme Court of Estonia Tõnu Anton. In December 2021 Madise was re-appointed by the Riigikogu for a second term as Chancellor of Justice.

Biography 
Her father is Tõnu Anton, a former member of the Supreme Court of Estonia and signatory of the ratification of the Estonian restoration of Independence. Ülle Madise is also a professor of constitutional law at the University of Tartu.

Education
Madise graduated in 1993 from Tartu Descartes School and in 1998 received a cum laude from the University of Tartu, Faculty of Law.

Work
 1997–1998 Specialist, Department of Public Law, Ministry of Justice
 1998–2002 Head of the Department of Public Law, Ministry of Justice
 2001–2005 Lecturer at the University of Tartu
 2002 Parliamentary Adviser to the Minister for Justice
 2002–2005 Adviser to the Constitutional Committee of the Riigikogu
 2005–2009 Teacher at the Ragnar Nurkse Department of Innovation and Governance, Tallinn University of Technology
 2006–2010 Member of the Estonian National Electoral Committee
 2009–2015 Legal adviser to the President of Estonia
 2009–2011 Professor of Public Law at the Tallinn University of Technology
 From 2011, professor of constitutional law at the University of Tartu, Department of Public Law, Department of State and Administrative Law
 From 2015, The Chancellor of Justice of Estonia

References

1974 births
Living people
Ombudsmen in Estonia
21st-century Estonian women
Academic staff of the University of Tartu
Academic staff of the Tallinn University of Technology
Estonian legal scholars
Women legal scholars